Francesca Violant Cervera i Gòdia (born 12 June 1969) is a Spanish politician from Catalonia, former member of the Parliament of Catalonia and the current Minister of Social Rights of Catalonia.

Early life
Cervera was born on 12 June 1969 in Lleida, Catalonia. She has a degree in Hispanic philology from the University of Lleida (1994). She joined the Nationalist Youth of Catalonia (JNC) in 1989 and the Democratic Convergence of Catalonia (CDC) in 1990.

Career
Cervera was a JNC national councillor and head of its Lleida branch (1997–99). She was a CDC national councillor (1996-00, 2004–08 and 2008–11) and has been a member of its Lleida branch committee since 2004. She has been head of the Casa Gran del Catalanisme's Lleida branch since 2008. In October 2016 Cervera ran for the leadership of the Catalan European Democratic Party's Lleida branch but was defeated by Joan Reñé i Huguet, receiving 26 votes to Reñé's 30 votes.

Cervera was Director General of Civic and Community Action at the Generalitat de Catalunya's Department of Social Welfare and Family from 2011 to 2012. She has been the Government of Catalonia's delegate in Lleida since 2018.

Cervera contested the 1991 local elections as a JNC candidate in Lleida. At the 2009 European elections she was placed 26th on the Coalition for Europe electoral alliance's list of candidates but the alliance only managed to win three seats and as a result she failed to get elected.

Cervera contested the 2012 regional election as a Convergence and Union (CiU) electoral alliance candidate in the Province of Lleida and was elected to the Parliament of Catalonia. She was re-elected at the 2015 regional election.

At the 2021 regional election Cervera was placed 14th on the Together for Catalonia electoral alliance's list of candidates in the Province of Lleida but the alliance only managed to win five seats in the province and as a result she failed to get elected. On 26 May 2021 she was sworn in as Minister of Social Rights in the new government of President Pere Aragonès.

Cervera is a member of Òmnium Cultural and president of the Friends of the Casa Gran del Catalanisme Association of Lleida (Associació Amics de la Casa Gran del Catalanisme de Lleida). She is a member of the Revista 16 del Pla d’Urgell's editorial team.

Electoral history

References

External links

1969 births
Aragonès Government
Catalan European Democratic Party politicians
Convergence and Union politicians
Democratic Convergence of Catalonia politicians
Living people
Members of the 10th Parliament of Catalonia
Members of the 11th Parliament of Catalonia
People from Lleida
Social affairs ministers of Catalonia
Together for Catalonia (2020) politicians
University of Lleida alumni
Women members of the Parliament of Catalonia